Greasy Creek may refer to:

Greasy Creek, Kentucky, an unincorporated community in Pike County
Greasy Creek (Kentucky), a stream in Leslie County, in whose drainage area is the John Shell Cabin
Greasy Creek (Big Sugar Creek tributary), a stream in Missouri
Greasy Creek (Castor River tributary), a stream in Missouri
Greasy Creek (McKenzie Creek tributary), a stream in Missouri
Greasy Creek (Niangua River tributary), a stream in Missouri
Greasy Creek (Saline River tributary), a stream in Missouri